Rosine Jozef Perelberg is a Brazilian-born British psychoanalyst. She served as president of the British Psychoanalytical Society between 2019 and 2022.

Career 
Perelberg completed her master's degree in 1980 at Universidade Federal do Rio de Janeiro, and received her PhD in Social Anthropology from the London School of Economics, University of London in 1983. Towards the end of her PhD, Perelberg worked with anorexia nervosa patients at Maudsley Hospital, before moving into a role as Senior Psychotherapist and Family Therapist at the Marlborough Family Service, where she worked between 1981 and 1991. For 18 years, between 1997 and 2016, Perelberg was the coordinator of the Freud Seminars as part of the MSc in Psychoanalytic Theory at University College London (UCL), as well as those on Sexuality. Perelberg has been a visiting professor at UCL since 2008. Between 2011 and 2012, she was also a visiting fellow at Birkbeck, University of London.

Perelberg served as president of the British Psychoanalytical Society between 2019 and 2022, and is also a fellow of the society.

Perelberg is known for her work on unconscious phantasy, and the treatment of violent patients. She has also discussed excess trauma and helplessness in treatment of patients. In the BBC news she has discussed slip-ups in language and what they reveal about a person. She has also been quoted by The Guardian in stories about overcoming hypochondria and nervousness about singing in public.

Works
Perelberg, R. J. (2020), Sexuality Excess and Representations. London: Routledge and The New Library of Psychoanalysis, ISBN 9780367253554
Perelberg, R. J. and Kohon, G. (2017), The Greening of Psychoanalysis: Andre Green New Paradigm in Contemporary Theory and Practice. London: Karnac, ISBN 9781782205623
Perelberg, R. J. (2016), Psychic Bisexuality: A British French Dialogue. London: Routledge and The New Library of Psychoanalysis, ISBN 9781138579033
Perelberg, R. J. (2015), Murdered Father, Dead Father: Revisiting the Oedipus Complex. London: Routledge and The New Library of Psychoanalysis, ISBN 9781138841840
Perelberg, R. J., preface by Green, A. (2008), Time, Space and Phantasy. London: Routledge and The New Library of Psychoanalysis, ISBN 9780415463225
(Eds) Raphael-Leff, J. and Perelberg, R. J. (2008), Female Experience: Four Generations of British Women Psychoanalysts on Work with Women. London: The Anna Freud Centre, ISBN 9780954931919
(Ed) Perelberg, R. J. (2007), Time and Memory. London: Karnac, ISBN 9781855754348
Perelberg, R. J. (2005), Freud: A Modern Reader. London: Whurr (Distributed by Wileys and Sons ltd.), ISBN 9781861564023
Perelberg, R. J. (2000), Dreaming and Thinking. London: Karnac, ISBN 9781855759787
Perelberg, R. J. (1999), Psychoanalytic Understanding of Violence and Suicide. London: Routledge and The New Library of Psychoanalysis, ISBN 9780415199322
(Eds) Perelberg, R. J. and Miller, A. C. (1990) Gender and Power in Families. London: Routledge, ISBN 9781780490656

Selected publications

Reviewed in 

Reviewed in

Awards and honors 
In 1991, Perelberg was the co-recipient of the Sacerdoti Prize at the International Psychoanalytic Association Congress, in Buenos Aires. Her book, Psychic Bisexuality, won the American Board & Academy of Psychoanalysis Book Prize for an edited book in 2019.

References

External links 
 
British Psychoanalytical Society, 'Paternal Function and Star Wars' from Five Lectures on Sexuality, October 2019.
BPAS,  ‘The Empty Couch: Love and Mourning in Times of Confinement’.

Living people
1951 births
British psychoanalysts
Alumni of the London School of Economics
Academics of University College London